Michael Williamson may refer to:

Mike Williamson (broadcaster) (1928-2019), Australian rules football commentator and broadcaster
Mike Williamson (footballer) (born 1983), English footballer
Michael Williamson (Australian unionist) (born 1953), Australian unionist and convicted fraudster
Michael Williamson (photographer) (born 1957), American photographer
Michael Z. Williamson (born 1967), American science fiction and military-fiction author
Michael Williamson (swimmer) (born 1981), Irish swimmer